Runaway Creek is a  long 2nd order tributary to the Banister River in Halifax County, Virginia.

Variant names
According to the Geographic Names Information System, it has also been known historically as:
 Runway Creek

Course 
Runaway Creek rises about 0.5 miles south of North Stanton, Virginia in Halifax County and then flows south to join the Banister River about 2.0 miles southeast of Leda.

Watershed 
Runaway Creek drains  of area, receives about 45.4 in/year of precipitation, has a wetness index of 385.15, and is about 51% forested.

See also 
 List of Virginia Rivers

References 

Rivers of Virginia
Rivers of Halifax County, Virginia]
Tributaries of the Roanoke River